Zaķusala is one of several islands in the Daugava river in the central part of Riga, the capital of Latvia. A part of the city's Salas neighbourhood, Zaķusala is home to the Riga Radio and TV Tower, which was completed in 1986 and the Latvian Television building, also completed the same year. The tower is the tallest structure in the Baltic states. On the northern tip of the island, alongside the railway trestles are remnants of the Iron Bridge that was blown up during the Second World War.

Gallery

External links
 Engraving from collection of Johann Christoph Brotze, depicting the 1701 battle of Swedish King Carl XII against Saxons before Riga during the Northern War. The viewer is facing South. Islands in the Daugava are clearly visible. Many of them though have either disappeared or have joined with other islands since then. Modern day Zaķusala is located where there is an island group in the top part of the landscape.

References

Neighbourhoods in Riga
Islands in Riga